Holy See–Spain relations are foreign relations between the Holy See and Spain. Both countries established diplomatic relations in 1480. This is the oldest permanent diplomatic mission in history. The Holy See has a nunciature in Madrid. Spain has an embassy in Rome.

History

The Spanish Inquisition was an ecclesiastical tribunal started in 1478 by Catholic Monarchs Ferdinand II of Aragon and Isabella I of Castile for the newly united Kingdom of Spain. It was intended to maintain Catholic orthodoxy in their kingdoms, and to replace the medieval inquisition, which was under Vatican control. Spain's diplomatic mission in Rome grew out of the Inquisition as well as out of the exploration of the New World. The first Spanish ambassador to Rome, Gonzalo de Beteta, was appointed in 1480, thus establishing the oldest permanent diplomatic mission in the history of the world.

The mission resulted in important projects of cooperation between the two states. These included Vatican support for the Granada War, the partition of the New World between Spain and Portugal via the  “Bula Inter Caetera” in 1493 (see Treaty of Tordesillas), and the creation of the Holy League, which led to a key victory for Christendom at the Battle of Lepanto.

For most of the reign of Pope Alexander VI (1492-1503), the Church had its own diplomatic representation in Spain. The Holy See's embassy was renewed in 1506 by Pope Julius II.

After 1978
After the new Spanish Constitution was adopted in 1978, the constitution set forth the principle of Separation of Church and State, although the state continued to fund public schools run by the Catholic Church.

The relations of the Holy See with the recent Zapatero's PSOE government were strained because of legislation allowing for same-sex marriage and liberalisation of abortion, the end of religious education in public schools, and general political support for secularism. The government expressed an esteem for the heritage of the Spanish Republicans of the 19th and 20th centuries, many of whom were strongly anticlerical, especially during the Spanish Civil War. It also questioned the role of the Spanish monarchy in national politics.

This contrasts with previous Spanish administrations, many of which had been keen on promoting Spain's historic Catholic culture and identity, such as under Francisco Franco, for example. Relations were also good under Partido Popular (PP)'s Jose Maria Aznar and Mariano Rajoy.

See also
Foreign relations of the Holy See
Foreign relations of Spain
Apostolic Nuncio to Spain

References

External links
Address to the Spanish Ambassador
EMBAJADA MAS ANTIGUA / VAZQUEZ, EN EL VATICANO 
Ambassadors from 1582 to 1726 (Buscando a España en Roma, p. 276) 
Ambassadors from 1870s to Today (see Spanien) 

 

 
Spain
Bilateral relations of Spain